Muddy Creek is a stream in Cass County in the U.S. state of Missouri. It is a tributary of the South Grand River.

Muddy Creek was named for the muddy character of its water.

See also
List of rivers of Missouri

References

Rivers of Cass County, Missouri
Rivers of Missouri